Methylethyltryptamine (abbreviated as MET) may refer to:

 N-Methyl-N-ethyltryptamine
 4-Methyl-α-ethyltryptamine
 7-Methyl-α-ethyltryptamine